Mark Kendall may refer to:
Mark Kendall (footballer, born 1958) (1958–2008), Welsh football goalkeeper
Mark Kendall (footballer, born 1961), English footballer
Mark Kendall (artist), American artist and filmmaker
Mark Kendall (engineer) (born 1972), Australian engineer
Mark Kendall (born 1957), American guitarist for the band Great White